This is a list of acts of the Parliament of South Africa enacted in the years 1960 to 1969.

South African acts are uniquely identified by the year of passage and an act number within that year. Some acts have gone by more than one short title in the course of their existence; in such cases each title is listed with the years in which it applied.

1960

1961

1962

1963

1964

1965

1966

1967

1968

1969

References
 Government Gazette of the Union of South Africa, Volumes CXCIX–CCIV.
 Government Gazette of the Republic of South Africa, Volumes 1–49.
 

1960